Sitnyakovo is a summer royal residence in Bulgaria. It is located on Rila mountain.

The residence was built on commission by Ferdinand I of Bulgaria. Sitnyakovo is situated in close proximity to the Borovets resort and the Tsarska Bistritsa palace. It was designed by architect Georgi Fingov and built in 1904. The house carry architectural features akin to the Tsarska Bistritsa hunting residence – the traditional utilitarian high-mountain construction with coherent art nouveau decorations and interior furnishing.

In 1913, at Sitnyakovo, Ferdinand I signed the treaty among the Balkan countries ahead of the Balkan Wars.

After the fall of the monarchy, during the communist regime, Sitnyakovo was used by the Writer's Union.

This royal residence was returned to Tsar Simeon II after the liberation in the 1990s.

Notes

References
Official site of H.M. King Simeon II

Art Nouveau architecture in Bulgaria
Royal residences in Bulgaria
Houses completed in 1904
Palaces in Bulgaria
Art Nouveau houses
Borovets